TransRe was formed in New York City,  USA in 1977 as a facultative Reinsurance division of AIG and wrote its first business on January 1, 1978. Its second office opened in Toronto in 1980, followed by expansion to Europe (London) and Asia Pacific (Tokyo) in 1982.

From 1991–2012 the company was traded on the NYSE. Following the merger of 2012, TransRe is a wholly owned subsidiary of Alleghany Corporation.

Operations 
TransRe provides all Property & Casualty Reinsurance product lines, on both a treaty and facultative basis, through brokers and directly, to insurance companies worldwide.
The company has four regional divisions, and four principal operating divisions:

References

External links 
 
 International Insurance Groups promote microinsurance, January 22 2015, Business Insurance News 1/22/2015
 A M Best Company, Inc.
 AIG to sell Transatlantic stake
 TransRe buys 45% stake in Paraguayan insurer
 marketwired.com
 Alleghany Annual Letter 2014, Alleghany Corporation

American International Group
Financial services companies established in 1977
Reinsurance companies